Hughesy, Ed and Erin is an Australian breakfast radio show on 2Day FM. The show is hosted by Dave Hughes, Ed Kavalee and Erin Molan. A one-hour highlights package airs nationally at 6pm across the Hit Network.

The show commenced on Monday, 18 January 2021.

History 
In November 2020, Southern Cross Austereo announced that Dave Hughes, Ed Kavalee and Erin Molan would replace Jamie Angel's Music for Breakfast to host Hughesy, Ed and Erin Molan from Monday, 18 January 2021. A one-hour highlights package will air nationally at 6pm across the Hit Network.

In December 2021, Jack Laurence resigned as anchor of the show.

References

External links 
 2Day FM

Australian radio comedy